

List

References

V